Newmills is a small village in east County Tyrone, Northern Ireland,  from Dungannon and  from Coalisland. Newmills gets its name from a corn mill and kilns that formerly stood in the area. Local amenities include a primary school, a local shop and a number of churches.  It currently has a population of approximately 400 people. The River Torrent flows through the village.

Places of interest
Annaginny Fisheries is a stocked and managed fishery.
Roughan Castle was built in 1618 by Sir Andrew Stewart.
Newmills Presbyterian Church.

Politics
Newmills is in the Dungannon and South Tyrone Borough Council area at the geographic centre of the Torrent ward.

Sport
Association Football is most popular local sport, and a number of teams from Newmills enter local leagues in the South Tyrone area.

People
Robert Morrow, received the Victoria Cross for bravery on 12 April 1915 near Messines, Belgium during World War I. He was killed in action on 26 April 1915.
Lydia Mary Foster, novelist, writer and poet, was the daughter of Rev. James Foster, the Presbyterian Minister of Newmills from 1850 to 1890.

References

Villages in County Tyrone